Solomon Tufa Demse (born 31 December 1998) is an Ethiopian taekwondo practitioner. He represented Ethiopia at the 2020 Summer Olympics held in Tokyo, Japan.

Career 

He competed in the men's finweight event at the 2015 World Taekwondo Championships held in Chelyabinsk, Russia. He was eliminated in his first match.

In 2018, at the African Taekwondo Championships held in Agadir, Morocco, he won the gold medal in the men's 54 kg event.

He represented Ethiopia at the 2019 African Games held in Rabat, Morocco and he won one of the bronze medals in the men's 54 kg event.

He competed in the men's 58 kg event at the 2020 Summer Olympics held in Tokyo, Japan. He won his first match against Sergio Suzuki of Japan and he then lost against Mohamed Khalil Jendoubi of Tunisia. He was then eliminated in the repechage by Mikhail Artamonov of the ROC.

Achievements

References

External links 
 

Living people
1998 births
Place of birth missing (living people)
Ethiopian male taekwondo practitioners
African Games medalists in taekwondo
African Games bronze medalists for Ethiopia
Competitors at the 2019 African Games
African Taekwondo Championships medalists
Taekwondo practitioners at the 2020 Summer Olympics
Olympic taekwondo practitioners of Ethiopia
21st-century Ethiopian people